The 2013–14 Tijuana season is the 67th professional season of Mexico's top-flight football league. The season is split into two tournaments—the Torneo Apertura and the Torneo Clausura—each with identical formats and each contested by the same eighteen teams.

Torneo Apertura

Squad

Regular season

Apertura 2013 results

Goalscorers

Results

Results summary

Results by round

References

Club Tijuana
Tijuana